Tiffin Township is one of twelve townships in Defiance County, Ohio, United States. The 2010 census reported 1,612 residents in the township.

Geography
Located in the northeastern part of the county, it borders the following townships:
Springfield Township, Williams County - north
Ridgeville Township, Henry County - northeast corner
Adams Township - east
Richland Township - southeast
Noble Township - south
Delaware Township - southwest corner
Washington Township - west
Pulaski Township, Williams County - northwest corner

No municipalities are located in Tiffin Township, although the unincorporated community of Evansport lies on its border with Springfield Township.

Name and history
Tiffin Township was established in 1832, and named for the Tiffin River which flows through it. Statewide, the only other Tiffin Township is located in Adams County.

Government
The township is governed by a three-member board of trustees, who are elected in November of odd-numbered years to a four-year term beginning on the following January 1. Two are elected in the year after the presidential election and one is elected in the year before it. There is also an elected township fiscal officer, who serves a four-year term beginning on April 1 of the year after the election, which is held in November of the year before the presidential election. Vacancies in the fiscal officership or on the board of trustees are filled by the remaining trustees.

Transportation
Two significant highways in Tiffin Township are State Route 15, which travels from northwest to southeast in the southwestern corner of the township; and State Route 66, which travels north–south through the eastern half of the township.

References

External links
County website

Townships in Defiance County, Ohio
Townships in Ohio